The 2018–19 Khuzestan Premier League season was the 19th season of the Khuzestan Premier League which took place from September 7, 2018, to April 26, 2019, with 16 teams competing from the province of Khuzestan. This was the second year that the league played with 16 teams. Teams played home and away with one another each playing 28 matches. Eftekhar Shushtar finished the season on top of the standings and was promoted to division 3 of the Iranian football system. Meanwhile, with Esteghlal Veys' withdrawal from the league, they will be relegated to the Khuzestan Division 1 along with last place finishers Esteghlal Abadan.

League changes
During week 4 of the season, Esteghlal Veys did not take the field against Jonub Susangerd due to monetary issues. The team officially withdrew from the league prior to the start of week 5 matches. The league continued with the remaining 15 teams and Esteghlal's results were removed from league records. Week 30 was scheduled to take place prior to the New Year, however, due to bad weather conditions, the league cancelled 4 matches while playing only those matches that would alter the league champion and the team being relegated.

Teams

Final standings

Results

See also 

 2018–19 Azadegan League
 2018–19 League 2
 2018–19 League 3
 2018–19 Hazfi Cup
 2019 Iranian Super Cup

References 

1
Iran
Khuzestan Premier League